Bantam or Bantams may refer to:
 Bantam (poultry), any small variety of fowl, usually of chicken or duck

Businesses
 Bantam Books, an American publishing house 
 Bantam Cider, an American cider company 
 Bantam Press, a British publishing imprint 
 American Bantam, a 1935 car company, formerly American Austin Car Company

Military
 Bantam (military), a soldier shorter than 5'3" in the First World War 
143rd Battalion (British Columbia Bantams), CEF
216th Battalion (Bantams), CEF
 Bantam (missile), a Swedish 1950s anti-tank missile
 BAT Bantam, a British 1920s biplane fighter aircraft 
 Northrop X-4 Bantam, an American prototype small twinjet aircraft
 Douglas A-4 Skyhawk light attack aircraft, nicknamed Bantam Bomber

Places
 Banten (town), also written as Bantam, a port town in Java, Indonesia
 Banten Sultanate, or Bantam, 1527–1813
 Banten, current province of Indonesia on territory of the former sultanate
 Bantam, Cocos (Keeling) Islands
 Bantam, Connecticut, U.S.
 Bantam, Ohio, U.S.
 Bantam River, Connecticut, U.S.

Sports
 Bantam, U15 age category in minor ice hockey 
 Bradford City A.F.C., nicknamed The Bantams, an English football club
 Trinity College Bantams, the varsity and club athletic teams of Trinity College (Connecticut)
 SC United Bantams, a soccer team in Columbia, South Carolina, U.S.

Transportation
 Micro Aviation B22 Bantam, a New Zealand microlight aircraft
 Warwick W-3 Bantam, an American homebuilt aircraft design
 Bantam (car), a 1913 British cyclecar
American Bantam, name adopted by the former American Austin Car Company in 1935 until 1956
 Ford Bantam, a South African pickup truck from 1983
 BSA Bantam, a British motorcycle 1948–1971
 HNLMS Bantam (1938), a Dutch ship
 MS Bantam (1939), a Dutch ship
 SS Bantam (1930), a Dutch ship

Other uses
 Bantam (comics), a comic character
 Bantam, official mascot of Trinity College (Connecticut)
 Bantam connector, a type of phone connector
 Bantam microRNA, a short RNA molecule

See also

 Bantamweight, a weight class in combat sports